Bucerius Law School (pronounced ) is a private law school located in Hamburg, Germany. The school is the first private law school in Germany. It admits approximately 100 undergraduate students per year.

Origins and structure

Bucerius Law School was founded in 2000 by one of Germany's largest foundations, ZEIT-Stiftung Ebelin und Gerd Bucerius following the model of law schools in the United States, and bearing the name of Gerd Bucerius, a noted German judge, attorney, journalist, politician and founding publisher of Germany's leading weekly newspaper, Die Zeit. Organized as a non-profit GmbH, its mission statement is "Freedom of Thought – Academic Renewal – Social Responsibility".

There are specific institutes for corporate and capital market law, the law of foundations and non-profit organizations, dispute resolution and for IP and Media Law. The school attracts a large number of visiting scholars and speakers from all over the world and hosts conferences on various topics.

Programs of study

The school offers two different degree programs of study: The general law program, leading to a Bachelor of Laws (LL.B.) and to the German First Judicial Examination (Staatsexamen), and the Master of Law and Business (M.L.B.) program (in cooperation with WHU – Otto Beisheim School of Management). Moreover, it grants doctoral (Dr. iur.) and habilitation titles, offers four summer certificate programs.

Admission
Admission to the school is highly competitive. Applicants for the LL.B. must first take a specially designed written exam with essay and multiple choice components. The test is made and assessed by an independent outside evaluator. Approximately the top 232 applicants are then invited back for an oral component of two personal interviews, a prepared presentation, and group discussions. All applicants must have English proficiency supported by a minimum score of 95 on the TOEFL, which is equivalent to that required of many American LL.M. programs. Approximately 116 students are then admitted each year. Bucerius is known as the most selective law school in Germany, and one of the most selective post-secondary institutions generally. 8.68% of students are scholars of the German National Academic Foundation (Studienstiftung des Deutschen Volkes). This figure is the highest percentage of any institution of higher education in Germany.

Rankings and reputation

Bucerius Law School is generally ranked the number one law school in Germany. Apart from its overall first-place ranking, it is ranked first in the following sub-categories: best professors and lecturers, course offerings, qualifications, from student-to-student, lecture halls and seminar rooms, library, computer and internet, overall conditions, study environment, handicapped accessibility, relevance of studies to practice, foreign exchange program, and feel-good factor of the campus. The elite status of the school is supported by the graduates academic performance on the German bar exam (Staatsexamen) in which its students have consistently performed at the top since its founding: "What counts in the competition with other universities is substance and results. One was proud accordingly when in 2004 the first students of the law school took the state exam: more than 90 percent achieved an exam with distinction, while the national average was below 20 percent. The Bucerius Law School had finally established itself at the peak of the judicial university landscape." Correspondingly, graduates have very strong career opportunities, with most students having multiple job offers upon graduation. Approximately 60% of the class begins their careers with large international law firms, with the balance joining leading companies and pursuing further academic qualifications, such as an LL.M. or Dr. iur. The unique prestige that sets Bucerius apart from other universities has led a scholar to describe it as a "German Ivy".

LL.B. and Staatsexamen program

The three-and-a-half-year LL.B. program is divided into ten trimesters. After its completion, students focus on preparation for the German First Judicial Examination (the regular law degree) in order to be admitted to legal traineeship. The entire program lasts 4.5 to 5 years and includes a mandatory trimester or semester abroad.

Besides the extensive legal education, the school places special importance on the required Studium generale as well as an emphasis on foreign languages and economics. Students must complete internships at law firms, businesses or organizations, many of which support the school as donors. Students are required to spend at least one term abroad and study law in a language other than German. The school has formed extensive international partnerships with more than 90 law schools in 32 countries, including leading institutions such as Stanford University, Indiana University Maurer School of Law, Columbia University, University of Texas School of Law, the University of Oxford, University of Cambridge, University of York, Cornell University Law School, Georgetown University Law Center, New York University School of Law, Sciences Po, Paris 1 Panthéon-Sorbonne University, The University of Queensland, The University of New South Wales, The University of Sydney, Osgoode Hall, Universität St. Gallen, Singapore Management University, National University of Singapore, ESADE, Victoria University of Wellington and others.

The school admits the best 116 applicants every year for the LL.B./Staatsexamen program. They are selected through a demanding written and oral admissions procedure, which stretches over two rounds in the months of May and July each year. Most of the admitted students graduated at the top of their high school class. About 10% of the students are national merit scholars, the highest rate among German institutions of higher education. Over 75% of the Bucerius graduates achieve an "outstanding" distinction (Prädikat) grade over 9 points in the German Judicial State Examination. Career prospects for graduates are very strong, as demonstrated by hiring-manager rankings and the multiple employment offers each student typically receives.

The tuition fee is 4,300 Euros per trimester, for a total of 12 trimesters. Financial aid includes scholarships, student loans and a special "study first, pay later". This is a multi-generation student funding scheme that ensures affordability concerns do not prevent the best and most highly qualified students from attending Bucerius. It allows any students to attend for free with an agreement that they pay the university back a fixed percentage of their salary for a period of time after graduation, provided they meet certain minimal earnings requirements. Moreover, many students are recipients of external scholarships.

LL.M./MLB program

The Bucerius Master of Law and Business (LL.M./MLB) is a consecutive Master's degree.

Applicants must have a degree in either law, economics or business. The program aims at training international executives at the intersection of law and economics and strives to enable its students to analyse corporate issues from a legal and an economic perspective in an international context.

The program is taught in English and runs from the beginning of September to the end of July, divided into three trimesters. In the Fall trimester (September to December), two course periods are held. The second trimester (January to April) comprises one course block and an eight-week internship. In the third trimester (May to July), students write their thesis following another course block.

The Bucerius LL.M./MLB program admits 50 students a year in a separate admissions test. Tuition is 22,000 Euros.

Other programs

Bucerius also offers doctoral and post-doctoral studies.

Bucerius Law School has three Summer Programs: International Business Law, which was inaugurated in 2008; International Intellectual Property Transactions, which has been offered in cooperation with UC Hastings College of the Law since 2014; Legal technology and Operations, beginning in July 2018. The intensive English-taught programs bring together students and professors from around the world to explore the theory and practice of the given topic.

Each fall, about one hundred students from Bucerius' partner universities participate in the International Exchange focusing on International and Comparative Business Law. Approximately half of the students on Exchange at Bucerius are from English-speaking countries, with about thirty per cent from the United States. At the same time of the year, about one hundred students from Bucerius Law School visit the school's partner universities in exchange.

Extracurricular activities

There are two student-run publications: A political magazine called “Politik und Gesellschaft“ and the Bucerius Law Journal. There is a choir, orchestra, big band, theater group, Model United Nations Society, political student groups, Phi Delta Phi Inn and many sport clubs, whose teams compete against other universities in the annual "Champions Trophy." Moot Courts are offered in English law, international trade law, tax law and labor law.

Location and facilities

Bucerius Law School is located in the city center, near Hamburg's trade exhibition center and the park Planten un Blomen. Housed in a historic building that used to serve as the horticulture and botany buildings for the University of Hamburg, Bucerius features a full service Mensa, or cafeteria, offering a variety of hot meals daily. A new library building with a capacity of 450 workspaces was added to the eastern side of the main building in 2007. The library comprises 76,000 books and 2,355 periodicals in printed and electronic form; it is not open to the public. There are several computer labs, a napping room, a theater and an on-campus and bilingual (German/English) kindergarten. Important events such as major soccer-matches can be watched on a full screen in the lecture hall. There is a gym on-campus which students are free to use once an initial registration fee of 50 Euro has been paid. Showers are available both inside the gym and in the main building. On its top floor, Bucerius Law School has 15 separate rooms for students who wish to study with their friends in small groups. In cases of exam pressure and stress symptoms a coach from the university can be consulted. The school offers individual exam training sessions in its "exam clinic".

Alumni 
The Bucerius Alumni Association is the independent association of Bucerius Law School alumni and was founded in March 2004 by the first class of Bachelor graduates. As of September 2021, the association has over 1,800 members; over 90% of the graduates of each class join the association after their Bachelor’s degree.

The association represents a network of former students, academic staff and participants of the International Program; it is dedicated to the promotion of education and student support as well as the advancement of science and research. Among other things, it organises an annual graduate fair, an alumni dinner and various professional events. In addition, there are seven regional groups, three of which are located abroad, as well as various specialist and interest groups, which meet regularly for lectures and exchanges.

See also
 Bucerius Kunst Forum
 Education in Hamburg
 List of universities in Germany

References
 Christoph Luschin, A German Ivy? The Bucerius Law School, 19 Southwestern Journal of International Law 1 (2012).

Footnotes

External links 

Bucerius Law School
Bucerius Master of Law and Business
Bucerius Law Journal
Bucerius Alumni e.V. (Bucerius Law School Alumni Association)

Educational institutions established in 2000
Universities and colleges in Hamburg
Buildings and structures in Hamburg-Mitte
Law schools in Germany
2000 establishments in Germany